Behind bars may refer to:

Imprisonment
Life imprisonment
Behind Bars: The Definitive Guide to Music Notation: Book by Elaine Gould (2011, Faber Music Ltd.).

Film and TV
Louis Theroux: Behind Bars
Martha: Behind Bars (2005) TV-movie
Hinter Gittern – Der Frauenknast German television soap opera 1997

Music
Behind Bars (Slick Rick album), a 1994 album by Slick Rick
"Behind Bars" (Slick Rick song)
Behind Bars, album by 88 Fingers Louie, 1995
"Behind Bars", song from The Wanted (album), 2010
"Behind Bars", song by the Jayhawks from The Jayhawks (album), 1986
"Behind Bars", single by Fei Comodo, 2009